Pellorneum is a genus of passerine birds in the family Pellorneidae. Some of its species were formerly placed in the genus Trichastoma.

The genus contains the following species:
 Spot-throated babbler (Pellorneum albiventre)
 Marsh babbler (Pellorneum palustre)
 Puff-throated babbler (Pellorneum ruficeps)
 Brown-capped babbler (Pellorneum fuscocapillus)
 Buff-breasted babbler, (Pellorneum tickelli)
 Sumatran babbler, (Pellorneum buettikoferi)
 Temminck's babbler, (Pellorneum pyrrogenys)
 Javan black-capped babbler or rufous-browed babbler (Pellorneum capistratum)
Malayan black-capped babbler (Pellorneum nigrocapitatum)
Bornean black-capped babbler (Pellorneum capistratoides)
 Short-tailed babbler (Pellorneum malaccense)
 Ashy-headed babbler (Pellorneum cinereiceps)
 White-chested babbler, (Pellorneum rostratum)
 Sulawesi babbler, (Pellorneum celebense)
 Ferruginous babbler, (Pellorneum bicolor)

References

Collar, N. J. & Robson, C. 2007. Family Timaliidae (Babblers)  pp. 70 – 291 in; del Hoyo, J., Elliott, A. & Christie, D.A. eds. Handbook of the Birds of the World, Vol. 12. Picathartes to Tits and Chickadees. Lynx Edicions, Barcelona.

 
Pellorneidae
Bird genera
Taxonomy articles created by Polbot